The 1925 Purdue Boilermakers football team was an American football team that represented Purdue University during the 1925 Big Ten Conference football season.  In their fourth season under head coach James Phelan, the Boilermakers compiled a 3–4–1 record, finished in last place in the Big Ten Conference with an 0–3–1 record against conference opponents, and outscored  opponents by a total of 119 to 39. Harold L. Harmeson was the team captain.

Schedule

References

Purdue
Purdue Boilermakers football seasons
Purdue Boilermakers football